Spelaeoconcha paganettii is a species of very small air-breathing land snail, terrestrial pulmonate gastropod mollusks in the superfamily Pupilloidea.

The genus is monotypic, as also is the family.

Taxonomy 
The family Spelaeoconchidae is classified within the informal group Orthurethra, itself belonging to the clade Stylommatophora within the clade Eupulmonata (according to the taxonomy of the Gastropoda by Bouchet & Rocroi, 2005). The family Spelaeoconchidae has no subfamilies (according to the taxonomy of the Gastropoda by Bouchet & Rocroi, 2005).

Spelaeoconcha paganettii is the only species in the genus Spelaeoconcha and Spelaeoconcha is the only genus in the family Spelaeoconchidae.

Spelaeoconcha is the type genus of the family Spelaeoconchidae.

Distribution 
The distribution of Spelaeoconcha paganettii includes Croatia, Bosnia and Hercegovina.

Description 
The shell is whitish or pale yellowish, almost smooth and very shiny. The shell has 7 not very convex whorls. The last whorl is ascending shortly before the aperture. The aperture is without teeth. Apertural margin is thickened except on upper side, and with a wavy contour seen from the side. Umbilicus is open but very narrow, only partly covered by columellar margin of the aperture.

The width of the shell is 2.5–2.6 mm. The height of the shell is 5.4–6.1 mm.

Ecology 
This small snail was found under stone rubble, on blackish-brown soil in a cave.

References
This article incorporates public domain text from the reference 

 
Gastropods described in 1901
Monotypic gastropod genera